Aleida Quintana Ordaz (born 1987, in Querétaro de Arteaga) is a Mexican human rights activist trained as a social anthropologist. She was exiled to Spain due to the threats she experienced because of her activism.

Activism
In 2012, she began denouncing the disappearances of people occurred in Querétaro estate. She created a database of missing people, who were "human trafficking, feminicide, sexual exploitation, forced labour, hired killer, mendicity, domestic labour and forced marriage victims". Quintana found out there were more missing people than the official sources stated. Since this conviction of hers, she founded the organization T'ek'ei Grup Interdisciplinari por la Equidad. T'ek'ei actions consisted in accompanying missing people's relatives and investigating cases which authorities removed, focusing specially in the feminicide cases. Mexican government denied the existence of such crimes, being many of the government members people tied with illegal drug trade. Part of this interest for hiding these facts, came because Querétaro government did not want to smear its economic prosperity image, which had then one the highest Gross Domestic Product of Mexico.

It prepared a database of disappeared persons, who were "victims of human trafficking, femicides, sexual exploitation, forced labor, Desam, hitmen, begging, labor and forced marriage ”. Aleida discovered that there were more disappearances than the official sources said. With this conviction, she founded the organization T'ek'ei Grup Interdisciplinario por la Equidad. This organization dedicated itself to accompanying the families of the disappeared and investigated the cases that the authorities separated, focusing especially on the cases of femicides.The government denied the existence of stories of crimes, many members of the government being people linked to drug trafficking.

For her activism she has suffered threats, defamation and even up to three attacks. In January 2018, she was attacked in retaliation for revealing the authorities' cover-up of criminal acts. Quintana went into exile from his country with her partner, Fernando Valadez.2 They entered Spanish territory in March with the Amnesty International reception program.3

In 2015, she received the Cecilia Loría Saviñón Medal for her work in defense of women's human rights and her contribution in the fight for equality and the eradication of violence.

In 2017, she was given from the LVIII Querétaro estate term the honour of Medalla de Sor Juan Inés de la Cruz. When she received it, she stated that it is contradictory this very fact of receiving it.

Reaction against her activism consisted in threatenings, defamations and even three aggressions. In January 2018, she was attacked as a reprisal for uncovering the hiding of criminal actions by the authorities. Quintana went into exile from her country with her romantic partner, Fernando Valadez. They entered into Spanish territory in March through to the Amnesty International reception program.

References 

Mexican exiles
Mexican anthropologists
People from Querétaro
Mexican human rights activists
Women human rights activists
Mexican women anthropologists
1987 births
Living people